Race to the Sun is a novel written by Rebecca Roanhorse and was published on January 14, 2020. It is one of many books in the Rick Riordan Presents imprint, and focuses on Navajo mythology. The book follows Nizhoni Begay, who has the self-proclaimed power of detecting monsters, as she adventures with her brother, Mac, and her best friend, Davery Descheny, through a series of trials to the House of the Sun to find her father, who was taken by the mysterious Mr. Charles.

Synopsis 
Nizhoni Begay suspects her father's new boss of being a monster due to her so-called "monster-detecting abilities," and when her father goes missing after his boss, Mr. Charles attacks Nizhoni, she mistrusts him doubly so. Nizhoni, her brother Mac, and their best-friend-from-school Davery must follow in the footsteps of the legendary Hero Twins, and find the House of the Sun after surviving a quadruplet of trials, which will help them get Nizhoni's father back.

Development 
A short story written by Roanhorse about Nizhoni will be featured in the upcoming short story anthology book, The Cursed Carnival and Other Calamities. The cover art was revealed in February 2019 to have been by Dale Ray DeForest.

Reception 
Kirkus Reviews praised Roanhorse's writing and diverse Native American representation, saying, "By reimagining a traditional story in a contemporary context, populating it with faceted Native characters, and centering it on and around the Navajo Nation, Roanhorse shows that Native stories are active and alive ... Native readers will see themselves as necessary heroes while readers of all walks will want to be their accomplices." Common Sense Media gave the book four out of five stars. Publishers Weekly said, "Roanhorse draws on her husband’s heritage to reimagine Navajo stories and characters, delivering a fast-paced, exciting adventure. While the antagonists could stand further development, Nizhoni’s blend of snark, confidence, and humor proves as multifaceted as the satisfying tale’s focus on friendship, family, and cultural legacy."

The Laughing Place noted, "There is something also comforting in seeing how Roanhorse has tied up all the loose ends in Race to the Sun. Should this be a one-off in the "Rick Riordan Presents" banner, then it is a one a kind jewel that continues to promote the message of the book imprint. Every mythology is unique and exciting, and we should all learn about the cultures and heritages of everyone."

Some reviews, however, were more critical of the book's Navajo representation, like one at the American Indians in Children's Literature, which said that Race to the Sun "[failed] to observe traditional boundaries that normally protect cultural narratives from appropriation" and "there are some unusually problematic internal inconsistencies in the narrative and in some characterization." It also claimed that "Roanhorse must know that some traditional Navajo people consider her use of sacred figures and practices profoundly inappropriate. Those objections are well-documented; she just doesn’t care." On Social Justice Books, Michael Thompson criticized "[Roanhorse's] appropriation and distortions of Dine’ cultural narratives," saying not only that "this book is likely to reach a much larger audience of younger readers, who are both Native and non-Native," but also that "there are some unusually problematic internal inconsistencies in the narrative and in some characterization."

See also

References 

2020 American novels
2020 children's books
American children's novels
Native American mythology in popular culture
Native American novels